The 1940 Wayne Tartars football team represented Wayne University (later renamed Wayne State University) as an independent during the 1940 college football season. In their ninth year under head coach Joe Gembis, the Tartars compiled a 4–1–3 record and outscored all opponents by a combined total of 79 to 69.

Schedule

References

Wayne
Wayne State Warriors football seasons
Wayne Tartars football